The 10th Force Support Battalion (10 FSB) is an Australian Army logistics battalion and is part of the 17th Sustainment Brigade. Its role is to provide third line or 'general' support within an area of operations.

10 FSB is located at Lavarack Barracks and Ross Island Barracks in Townsville, Queensland, with Catering elements located in Darwin, Adelaide, Brisbane and Amberley. A Squadron of Engineers is located in Sydney and a Troop of Water Transport is located in Darwin.

History 
10 FSB was formed on 1 March 1998, following the amalgamation of the 10th Terminal Regiment, 2nd Field
Logistics Battalion and the 1st Division Postal Unit.

The battalion was awarded a Meritorious Unit Citation for operations in East Timor during INTERFET in 1999–2000, the first logistics unit to be honoured with such an award.

Current structure

The 10th Force Support Battalion currently consists of:
Battalion Headquarters (Townsville) 
1st Catering Company (Townsville, Darwin, Adelaide, Brisbane, Amberley)
2nd Combat Supply Company (Townsville)
10th Logistic Support Company (Townsville)
30th Terminal Squadron (Townsville)
68 Terminal Support Troop (including Amphibious Beach Team)
69 Terminal Support Troop
72 Terminal Support Troop
35th Water Transport Squadron 
70/71 Water Transport Troop (LCM-8, Townsville)
36 Water Transport Troop (LCM-8, Darwin)
42 Amphibious Troop (LARC-V, Townsville)
Littoral and Riverine Survey Squadron (RAE, Sydney)
Ship’s Army Detachment HMAS Choules

References

Further reading

Combat service support battalions of the Australian Army
Military units and formations established in 1998
Recipients of the Meritorious Unit Citation